Helen Golden may refer to:
 Helen Golden (athlete)
 Helen Golden (singer)